Hance House and Barn is a historic home located in East Bradford Township, Chester County, Pennsylvania. The house was built in 1795, and is a two-story, three bay, fieldstone structure with a gable roof.  It has a two-story, stone rear wing added about 1850.  The property also includes a contributing stone and frame bank barn, smoke house, and shed.

It was added to the National Register of Historic Places in 1985.

References

Houses on the National Register of Historic Places in Pennsylvania
Houses completed in 1795
Houses in Chester County, Pennsylvania
National Register of Historic Places in Chester County, Pennsylvania